Pterocerina ruficauda is a species of ulidiid or picture-winged fly in the genus Pterocerina of the family Ulidiidae.

References

ruficauda
Insects described in 1914